Rock Island Railroad Bridge may refer to:

 Rock Island Railroad Bridge (Columbia River) — an 1892 truss bridge built at Rock Island, Washington, by the Great Northern Railway (now the BNSF Railway)
 One of many bridges associated with the Chicago, Rock Island and Pacific Railroad, including:
 In Kansas:
 Rock Island Bridge (Kansas City) — a 1905 thru-truss bridge over the Kansas River between Kansas City, Kansas and Kansas City, Missouri, formerly maintained by the Rock Island Railroad, and no longer used for traffic
 Harry S. Truman Bridge — a 1945 Missouri River drawbridge between Jackson County and Clay County, Missouri, near Kansas City, built by the Rock Island Railroad and the Chicago, Milwaukee, St. Paul and Pacific Railroad, and now used by the Iowa, Chicago and Eastern Railroad and the Union Pacific
 On the Mississippi River:
 Rock Island Swing Bridge, also known as the Newport Rail Bridge or the J.A.R. Bridge — a former 1895 swing bridge over the upper Mississippi River between Inver Grove Heights and St. Paul Park, Minnesota, built for the South St. Paul Beltline Railroad, used by the Rock Island until 1980, also used for road traffic until 1999, and partially demolished in 2009
 Harahan Bridge, also called the Rock Island Bridge — a 1916 Mississippi River bridge between Memphis, Tennessee and Arkansas, and now maintained by the Union Pacific
 Government Bridge, current railroad swing bridge joining Rock Island, Illinois with Davenport, Iowa, location of the first Mississippi river railroad bridge

See also
 Rock Island Bridge (disambiguation)